Mike Mazzei is a former Republican United States politician from the U.S. state of Oklahoma and was an Assistant Majority Floor Leader of the Oklahoma Senate.

Electoral history
Mazzei was elected by an overwhelming majority in a five-person Republican primary in 2004. The Democratic Party did not field a candidate and no independent or third-party candidate filed for the general election; thus, the primary win resulted in his election to the Oklahoma Senate.

Mazzei faced no opposition in his 2008 election bid.

Personal life
In his personal profession, Mike Mazzei, CFP, is the president of Tulsa Wealth Advisors in Tulsa, Oklahoma. He created The Financial Freedom Process(r) to help individuals leverage their wealth in order to achieve their lifetime visions. He enjoys helping retirees and entrepreneurs develop comprehensive life, financial and investment strategies that enable them to reach greater success, enjoy life to the fullest and leave lasting legacies.

Senator Mazzei is a graduate of George Mason University and the College for Financial Planning, and is a member of the Financial Planners Association. Mike belongs to Asbury United Methodist Church and serves on the board for The Salvation Army.

Senate duties
Mazzei was appointed as Co-Chairman of the Senate Finance Committee in 2006 and re-appointed as the sole Chairman upon the Republican Majority election in 2008. He was also named to serve as a Republican Assistant Floor Leader in the Oklahoma State Senate in 2007, and in 2008 was elected to serve as Assistant Majority Floor Leader.

Election results

References
 Senator Mazzei's Official Website
 Oklahoma State Election Board, 2004

1965 births
Living people
Republican Party Oklahoma state senators
George Mason University alumni
Politicians from Tulsa, Oklahoma
21st-century American politicians